The 2020 Speed Energy Stadium Super Trucks Series was the eighth season of the Stadium Super Trucks and the first in which the series was split into two championships, with the Speed Energy Stadium Super Trucks in the United States and the Boost Mobile Super Trucks in Australia.

Much of the series' calendar after the season-opening Adelaide 500 in February—held as a combination event with the Boost Mobile Super Trucks—was wiped out by the COVID-19 pandemic. After a six-month hiatus, the trucks returned in August at Road America. Standings were not officially tracked by the series, but Robby Gordon was the lone driver to record podium finishes in every race while reigning champion Matthew Brabham won twice.

Drivers

Schedule
The full schedule was revealed on November 21, 2019, with the series being divided into the American Speed Energy Stadium Super Trucks and the Australian Boost Mobile Super Trucks; both championships intended to run three combination rounds.

Races canceled due to the COVID-19 pandemic

Season summary

The 2020 season began with a combination race weekend with the Boost Mobile Super Trucks at Adelaide Street Circuit. The weekend, which was promoted as an "Australia v USA Series", saw eight Australian drivers and three Americans (defending champion Matthew Brabham holds dual citizenship with both countries). Robby Gordon and Bill Hynes, who ran the full 2019 schedule, returned for Adelaide; fellow American Sara Price made her SST return after last racing in 2017. Gordon won Race 1 after starting first (he did not set a qualifying time due to steering problems, placing him on pole position due to an inverted grid) and holding off a charge by Toby Price on the final turn. Matt Mingay and Paul Morris dominated the second race until Gordon and Brabham passed them late in the event; the two ran side by side to the finish with Brabham winning by just 0.0361 seconds. Shae Davies, a series newcomer, won the final race after avoiding early wrecks and distancing himself from the field as they fought for position.

Due to the COVID-19 pandemic, the Grand Prix of Long Beach, originally scheduled for April 18–19, was canceled, ending a nine-year streak for SST at the street circuit dating back to the series' inaugural season in 2013. The combination Perth SuperNight at Wanneroo Raceway on May 16–17 was postponed, though SST intends to commit to the rescheduled date once it is finalized. Another combination weekend with the Gold Coast 600 on October 31–November 1 was excluded from the revised Supercars schedule in May. On May 18, Honda Indy Toronto was removed from its July 11–12 date after local legislation expanded the city's ban on major events through the month, with race officials planning to find a new date. The Grand Prix of Portland, planned for September 5–6, was called off on July 27, followed by the Honda Indy 200 (August 7–9) at Mid-Ohio Sports Car Course being postponed on August 1.

After a six-month dormancy, the season resumed in early August at Road America as a support event for the NASCAR Xfinity Series. Five drivers made their series debuts during the weekend: Barry Boes (Trans-Am Series), Gordon's son Max, Jett Noland and Zane Smith (NASCAR Gander RV & Outdoors Truck Series), and Zoey Edenholm (Formula 4 United States Championship). John Holtger, whose SST debut came at the track in 2019, Arie Luyendyk Jr., and two-time SST champion Sheldon Creed also returned to the trucks. Luyendyk won the first race after rolling over early in the event, while Brabham beat out Gordon to win the second.

The series initially planned to return to Lake Elsinore Diamond, which held races in 2017 and 2018, in October before it was called off.

Results and standings

Race results

Drivers' championship
Points are approximate based on the points system and unofficial as the series did not track standings for the 2020 season.

See also
 Impact of the COVID-19 pandemic on motorsport

Notes

References

Stadium
Stadium
Stadium